The black-hooded thrush (Turdus olivater) is a species of bird in the family Turdidae. It is mainly found in Venezuela and in certain parts of Colombia (mainly in the Sierra Nevada de Santa Marta). Its natural habitats are subtropical or tropical moist montane forests, subtropical or tropical high-altitude shrubland, and heavily degraded former forest.

References

black-hooded thrush
Birds of the Sierra Nevada de Santa Marta
Birds of Venezuela
black-hooded thrush
Taxonomy articles created by Polbot